Hans Georg Jacob Stang (17 November 1830–1 March 1907) was a Norwegian attorney, official, and politician. He was 
the Norwegian prime minister in Stockholm from 1888–1889.

Biography
Stang was born in Nannestad, Norway and attended Oslo Cathedral School until 1848, before graduating with a degree in law from the University of Christiania in 1852. He worked for a number of years as a judge in Christiania (now Oslo) before establishing his legal practice in Kongsvinger during 1859. From 1878 to 1884 he was a city judge in Christiania.

He entered into national politics as a member of the administration of Prime Minister Johan Sverdrup in 1884. He was member of the Council of State Division in Stockholm from 1884–1885 and again from 1886–1887. He was the Minister of the Interior from 1885–1886 and Minister of Justice from 1887–1888, as well as head of the Ministry of Justice in 1888. He also served as the County Governor of Lister og Mandals amt and Diocesan Governor of Kristiansand from 1889–1906.

Personal life
He married Anna Sophie Margrethe Holmsen on 28 December 1855. His wife was President of the Norwegian Association for Women's Rights. They were the parents of Georg Stang, who served as Norwegian Minister of Defense (1900–03). He died in Kristiansand on 1 March 1907.

References

1830 births
1907 deaths
People from Nannestad
Politicians from Kongsvinger
People educated at Oslo Cathedral School
University of Oslo alumni
19th-century Norwegian judges
Government ministers of Norway
19th-century Norwegian politicians
Ministers of Justice of Norway
County governors of Norway
Prime Ministers of Norway